Sambit Bal is an Indian journalist who was born and brought up in Bhubaneswar, India. He spent 15 years in mainstream journalism working in some of India's leading publishing houses before joining Wisden in 2001. He was the first editor of Wisden Asia Cricket and the Asian editor of wisden.com. In 2003, wisden.com acquired Cricinfo and the sites merged. Bal became the editor of Cricinfo in 2004. In 2007, Cricinfo was bought by ESPN. Upon that takeover, Bal wrote an open letter to the editor, admitting the site needed "fresh investments". He promised that Cricinfo would not lose its voice, and ultimately belonged to its users. He is also the founder editor of Cricinfo Magazine, which appeared for the first time in January 2006. Before joining Wisden, he edited Gentleman, a monthly features magazine published in Mumbai.

References

External links 
Sambit Bal articles at ESPN Cricinfo
 Couch Talk with Sambit Bal, Subash Jayaraman, The Cricket Couch, August 4, 2012
An unshakeable bond ESPN Cricinfo

Cricket historians and writers
Indian sports journalists
Living people
Year of birth missing (living people)